For the Summer Olympics, there are 25 venues that have been or will be used for diving.

References

Venues

Div
Olympic venues